Quantum superposition is a fundamental principle of quantum mechanics.  In classical mechanics, things like position or momentum are always well defined. We may not know what they are at any given time, but that is an issue of our understanding, and not the physical system. In quantum mechanics, a particle can be in a superposition of different states. It can be in two places at once (see double-slit experiment). A measurement always finds it in one state, but before and after the measurement, it interacts in ways that can only be explained by having a superpositions of different states.

Mathematically, much like waves in classical physics, any two (or more) quantum states can be added together ("superposed") and the result will be another valid quantum state; and conversely, that every quantum state can be represented as a sum of two or more other distinct states.  Mathematically, it refers to a property of solutions to the Schrödinger equation; since the Schrödinger equation is linear, any linear combination of solutions will also be a solution(s)
.

An example of a physically observable manifestation of the wave nature of quantum systems is the interference peaks from an electron beam in a double-slit experiment. The pattern is very similar to the one obtained by diffraction of classical waves.

Here  is the Dirac notation for the quantum state that will always give the result 0 when converted to classical logic by a measurement. Likewise  is the state that will always convert to 1. Contrary to a classical bit that can only be in the state corresponding to 0 or the state corresponding to 1, a qubit may be in a superposition of both states.  This means that the probabilities of measuring 0 or 1 for a qubit are in general neither 0.0 nor 1.0, and multiple measurements made on qubits in identical states will not always give the same result.

Concept
The principle of quantum superposition states that if a physical system may be in one of many configurations—arrangements of particles or fields—then the most general state is a combination of all of these possibilities, where the amount in each configuration is specified by a complex number.

For example, if there are two configurations labelled by 0 and 1, the most general state would be

where the coefficients are complex numbers describing how much goes into each configuration.

The principle was described by Paul Dirac as follows:

The general principle of superposition of quantum mechanics applies to the states [that are theoretically possible without mutual interference or contradiction] ... of any one dynamical system. It requires us to assume that between these states there exist peculiar relationships such that whenever the system is definitely in one state we can consider it as being partly in each of two or more other states. The original state must be regarded as the result of a kind of superposition of the two or more new states, in a way that cannot be conceived on classical ideas. Any state may be considered as the result of a superposition of two or more other states, and indeed in an infinite number of ways. Conversely, any two or more states may be superposed to give a new state...

The non-classical nature of the superposition process is brought out clearly if we consider the superposition of two states, A and B, such that there exists an observation which, when made on the system in state A, is certain to lead to one particular result, a say, and when made on the system in state B is certain to lead to some different result, b say. What will be the result of the observation when made on the system in the superposed state? The answer is that the result will be sometimes a and sometimes b, according to a probability law depending on the relative weights of A and B in the superposition process. It will never be different from both a and b [i.e., either a or b]. The intermediate character of the state formed by superposition thus expresses itself through the probability of a particular result for an observation being intermediate between the corresponding probabilities for the original states, not through the result itself being intermediate between the corresponding results for the original states.

Anton Zeilinger, referring to the prototypical example of the double-slit experiment, has elaborated regarding the creation and destruction of quantum superposition:

"[T]he superposition of amplitudes ... is only valid if there is no way to know, even in principle, which path the particle took. It is important to realize that this does not imply that an observer actually takes note of what happens. It is sufficient to destroy the interference pattern, if the path information is accessible in principle from the experiment or even if it is dispersed in the environment and beyond any technical possibility to be recovered, but in principle still ‘‘out there.’’ The absence of any such information is the essential criterion for quantum interference to appear.

Theory

Examples
For an equation describing a physical phenomenon, the superposition principle states that a combination of solutions to a linear equation is also a solution of it. When this is true the equation is said to obey the superposition principle. Thus, if state vectors ,  and  each solve the linear equation on ψ, then  would also be a solution, in which each  is a coefficient. The Schrödinger equation is linear, so quantum mechanics follows this.

For example, consider an electron with two possible configurations: up and down. This describes the physical system of a qubit.

is the most general state. But these coefficients dictate probabilities for the system to be in either configuration. The probability for a specified configuration is given by the square of the absolute value of the coefficient. The probabilities must add to 1, since the electron must be in one of those two states.

Continuing with this example, if a particle can be in state  up and  down, it can also be in a state where it is an amount  up and an amount  down.

Note that .

In the description, only the relative size of the different components matter, and their angle to each other on the complex plane. This is usually stated by declaring that two states which are a multiple of one another are the same as far as the description of the situation is concerned. Either of these describe the same state for any nonzero 

The fundamental law of quantum mechanics is that the evolution is linear, meaning that if state A turns into A′ and B turns into B′ after 10 seconds, then after 10 seconds the superposition  turns into a mixture of A′ and B′ with the same coefficients as A and B.

For example, if we have the following

Then after those 10 seconds our state will change to

So far there have just been 2 configurations, but there can be infinitely many.

In illustration, a particle can have any position, so that there are different configurations which have any value of the position . These are written:

The principle of superposition guarantees that there are states which are arbitrary superpositions of all the positions with complex coefficients:

This sum is defined only if the index  is discrete. The quantity  is called the wavefunction of the particle.

If we consider a qubit with both position and spin, the state is a superposition of all possibilities for both:

The configuration space of a quantum mechanical system cannot be worked out without some physical knowledge. The input is usually the allowed different classical configurations, but without the duplication of including both position and momentum.

A pair of particles can be in any combination of pairs of positions. A state where one particle is at position x and the other is at position y is written . The most general state is a superposition of the possibilities:

The description of the two particles is much larger than the description of one particle—it is a function in twice the number of dimensions. This is also true in probability, when the statistics of two random variables are correlated. If two particles are uncorrelated, the probability distribution for their joint position  is a product of the probability of finding one at one position and the other at the other position:

.

In 1927, Heitler and London, attempted to quantitatively mechanically calculate the ground steady state of the H2 molecule.  The calculations were based on the quantum superposition of the two hydrogen atoms that make up the system - H2 molecule. The success of this attempt became the basis for all further development of covalent bond.

Analogy with probability
In probability theory there is a similar principle. If a system has a probabilistic description, this description gives the probability of any configuration, and given any two different configurations, there is a state which is partly this and partly that, with positive real number coefficients, the probabilities, which say how much of each there is.

For example, if we have a probability distribution for where a particle is, it is described by the "state"

Where  is the probability density function, a positive number that measures the probability that the particle will be found at a certain location.

The evolution equation is also linear in probability, for fundamental reasons. If the particle has some probability for going from position x to y, and from z to y, the probability of going to y starting from a state which is half-x and half-z is a half-and-half mixture of the probability of going to y from each of the options. This is the principle of linear superposition in probability.

Quantum mechanics is different, because the numbers can be positive or negative. While the complex nature of the numbers is just a doubling, if you consider the real and imaginary parts separately, the sign of the coefficients is important. In probability, two different possible outcomes always add together, so that if there are more options to get to a point z, the probability always goes up. In quantum mechanics, different possibilities can cancel.

In probability theory with a finite number of states, the probabilities can always be multiplied by a positive number to make their sum equal to one. For example, if there is a three state probability system:

where the probabilities  are positive numbers. Rescaling x,y,z so that

The geometry of the state space is a revealed to be a triangle. In general it is a simplex. There are special points in a triangle or simplex corresponding to the corners, and these points are those where one of the probabilities is equal to 1 and the others are zero. These are the unique locations where the position is known with certainty.

In a quantum mechanical system with three states, the quantum mechanical wavefunction is a superposition of states again, but this time twice as many quantities with no restriction on the sign:

rescaling the variables so that the sum of the squares is 1, the geometry of the space is revealed to be a high-dimensional sphere
.

A sphere has a large amount of symmetry, it can be viewed in different coordinate systems or bases. So unlike a probability theory, a quantum theory has a large number of different bases in which it can be equally well described. The geometry of the phase space can be viewed as a hint that the quantity in quantum mechanics which corresponds to the probability is the absolute square of the coefficient of the superposition.

Hamiltonian evolution

The numbers that describe the amplitudes for different possibilities define the kinematics, the space of different states. The dynamics describes how these numbers change with time. For a particle that can be in any one of infinitely many discrete positions, a particle on a lattice, the superposition principle tells you how to make a state:

So that the infinite list of amplitudes  completely describes the quantum state of the particle. This list is called the state vector, and formally it is an element of a Hilbert space, an infinite-dimensional complex vector space. It is usual to represent the state so that the sum of the absolute squares of the amplitudes is one:

For a particle described by probability theory random walking on a line, the analogous thing is the list of probabilities , which give the probability of any position. The quantities that describe how they change in time are the transition probabilities , which gives the probability that, starting at x, the particle ends up at y time t later. The total probability of ending up at y is given by the sum over all the possibilities

The condition of conservation of probability states that starting at any x, the total probability to end up somewhere must add up to 1:

So that the total probability will be preserved, K is what is called a stochastic matrix.

When no time passes, nothing changes: for 0 elapsed time , the K matrix is zero except from a state to itself. So in the case that the time is short, it is better to talk about the rate of change of the probability instead of the absolute change in the probability.

where  is the time derivative of the K matrix:

The equation for the probabilities is a differential equation that is sometimes called the master equation:

The R matrix is the probability per unit time for the particle to make a transition from x to y. The condition that the K matrix elements add up to one becomes the condition that the R matrix elements add up to zero:

One simple case to study is when the R matrix has an equal probability to go one unit to the left or to the right, describing a particle that has a constant rate of random walking. In this case  is zero unless y is either x + 1, x, or x − 1, when y is x + 1 or x − 1, the R matrix has value c, and in order for the sum of the R matrix coefficients to equal zero, the value of  must be −2c. So the probabilities obey the discretized diffusion equation:

which, when c is scaled appropriately and the P distribution is smooth enough to think of the system in a continuum limit becomes:

Which is the diffusion equation.

Quantum amplitudes give the rate at which amplitudes change in time, and they are mathematically exactly the same except that they are complex numbers. The analog of the finite time K matrix is called the U matrix:

Since the sum of the absolute squares of the amplitudes must be constant,  must be unitary:

or, in matrix notation,

The rate of change of U is called the Hamiltonian H, up to a traditional factor of i:

The Hamiltonian gives the rate at which the particle has an amplitude to go from m to n. The reason it is multiplied by i is that the condition that U is unitary translates to the condition:

which says that H is Hermitian. The eigenvalues of the Hermitian matrix H are real quantities, which have a physical interpretation as energy levels. If the factor i were absent, the H matrix would be antihermitian and would have purely imaginary eigenvalues, which is not the traditional way quantum mechanics represents observable quantities like the energy.

For a particle that has equal amplitude to move left and right, the Hermitian matrix H is zero except for nearest neighbors, where it has the value c. If the coefficient is everywhere constant, the condition that H is Hermitian demands that the amplitude to move to the left is the complex conjugate of the amplitude to move to the right.

In the case in which left and right are symmetric, c is real. By redefining the phase of the wavefunction in time, the amplitudes for being at different locations are only rescaled, so that the physical situation is unchanged. But this phase rotation introduces a linear term.

which is the right choice of phase to take the continuum limit.

If there is an additional term in the H matrix that is an extra phase rotation that varies from point to point, the continuum limit is the Schrödinger equation with a potential energy:

These equations describe the motion of a single particle in non-relativistic quantum mechanics.

Quantum mechanics in imaginary time
The analogy between quantum mechanics and probability is very strong, so that there are many mathematical links between them. In a statistical system in discrete time, t=1,2,3, described by a transition matrix for one time step , the probability to go between two points after a finite number of time steps can be represented as a sum over all paths of the probability of taking each path:

The analogous expression in quantum mechanics is the path integral.

A generic transition matrix in probability has a stationary distribution, which is the eventual probability to be found at any point no matter what the starting point. If there is a nonzero probability for any two paths to reach the same point at the same time, this stationary distribution does not depend on the initial conditions. In probability theory, the probability m for the stochastic matrix obeys detailed balance when the stationary distribution  has the property:

Detailed balance says that the total probability of going from m to n in the stationary distribution, which is the probability of starting at m  times the probability of hopping from m to n, is equal to the probability of going from n to m, so that the total back-and-forth flow of probability in equilibrium is zero along any hop. The condition is automatically satisfied when n=m, so it has the same form when written as a condition for the transition-probability R matrix.

When the R matrix obeys detailed balance, the scale of the probabilities can be redefined using the stationary distribution so that they no longer sum to 1:

In the new coordinates, the R matrix is rescaled as follows:

and H is symmetric

This matrix H defines a quantum mechanical system:

whose Hamiltonian has the same eigenvalues as those of the R matrix of the statistical system. The eigenvectors are the same too, except expressed in the rescaled basis. The stationary distribution of the statistical system is the ground state of the Hamiltonian and it has energy exactly zero, while all the other energies are positive. If H is exponentiated to find the U matrix:

and t is allowed to take on complex values, the K' matrix is found by taking time imaginary.

For quantum systems which are invariant under time reversal the Hamiltonian can be made real and symmetric, so that the action of time-reversal on the wave-function is just complex conjugation. If such a Hamiltonian has a unique lowest energy state with a positive real wave-function, as it often does for physical reasons, it is connected to a stochastic system in imaginary time. This relationship between stochastic systems and quantum systems sheds much light on supersymmetry.

Experiments and applications
Successful experiments involving superpositions of relatively large (by the standards of quantum physics) objects have been performed.

 A "cat state" has been achieved with photons.
 A beryllium ion has been trapped in a superposed state.
 A double slit experiment has been performed with molecules as large as buckyballs and functionalized oligoporphyrins with up to 2000 atoms.
 A 2013 experiment superposed molecules containing 15,000 each of protons, neutrons and electrons. The molecules were of compounds selected for their good thermal stability, and were evaporated into a beam at a temperature of 600 K. The beam was prepared from highly purified chemical substances, but still contained a mixture of different molecular species. Each species of molecule interfered only with itself, as verified by mass spectrometry.
 An experiment involving a superconducting quantum interference device ("SQUID") has been linked to the theme of the "cat state" thought experiment.

By use of very low temperatures, very fine experimental arrangements were made to protect in near isolation and preserve the coherence of intermediate states, for a duration of time, between preparation and detection, of SQUID currents. Such a SQUID current is a coherent physical assembly of perhaps billions of electrons. Because of its coherence, such an assembly may be regarded as exhibiting "collective states" of a macroscopic quantal entity. For the principle of superposition, after it is prepared but before it is detected, it may be regarded as exhibiting an intermediate state. It is not a single-particle state such as is often considered in discussions of interference, for example by Dirac in his famous dictum stated above. Moreover, though the 'intermediate' state may be loosely regarded as such, it has not been produced as an output of a secondary quantum analyser that was fed a pure state from a primary analyser, and so this is not an example of superposition as strictly and narrowly defined.

Nevertheless, after preparation, but before measurement, such a SQUID state may be regarded in a manner of speaking as a "pure" state that is a superposition of a clockwise and an anti-clockwise current state.  In a SQUID, collective electron states can be physically prepared in near isolation, at very low temperatures, so as to result in protected coherent intermediate states. What is remarkable here is that there are two well-separated self-coherent collective states that exhibit such metastability. The crowd of electrons tunnels back and forth between the clockwise and the anti-clockwise states, as opposed to forming a single intermediate state in which there is no definite collective sense of current flow.

 An experiment involving a flu virus has been proposed.
 A piezoelectric "tuning fork" has been constructed, which can be placed into a superposition of vibrating and non-vibrating states. The resonator comprises about 10 trillion atoms.
 Recent research indicates that chlorophyll within plants appears to exploit the feature of quantum superposition to achieve greater efficiency in transporting energy, allowing pigment proteins to be spaced further apart than would otherwise be possible.
 An experiment has been proposed, with a bacterial cell cooled to 10 mK, using an electromechanical oscillator. At that temperature, all metabolism would be stopped, and the cell might behave virtually as a definite chemical species. For detection of interference, it would be necessary that the cells be supplied in large numbers as pure samples of identical and detectably recognizable virtual chemical species. It is not known whether this requirement can be met by bacterial cells. They would be in a state of suspended animation during the experiment.

In quantum computing the phrase "cat state" often refers to the GHZ state, the special entangled state of qubits wherein the qubits are in an equal superposition of all being 0 and all being 1; i.e.,

Formal interpretation
Applying the superposition principle to a quantum mechanical particle, the configurations of the particle are all positions, so the superpositions make a complex wave in space. The coefficients of the linear superposition are a wave which describes the particle as best as is possible, and whose amplitude interferes according to the Huygens principle.

For any physical property in quantum mechanics, there is a list of all the states where that property has some value. These states are necessarily perpendicular to each other using the Euclidean notion of perpendicularity which comes from sums-of-squares length, except that they also must not be i multiples of each other. This list of perpendicular states has an associated value which is the value of the physical property. The superposition principle guarantees that any state can be written as a combination of states of this form with complex coefficients.

Write each state with the value q of the physical quantity as a vector in some basis , a list of numbers at each value of n for the vector which has value q for the physical quantity. Now form the outer product of the vectors by multiplying all the vector components and add them with coefficients to make the matrix

where the sum extends over all possible values of q. This matrix is necessarily symmetric because it is formed from the orthogonal states, and has eigenvalues q. The matrix A is called the observable associated to the physical quantity. It has the property that the eigenvalues and eigenvectors determine the physical quantity and the states which have definite values for this quantity.

Every physical quantity has a Hermitian linear operator associated to it, and the states where the value of this physical quantity is definite are the eigenstates of this linear operator. The linear combination of two or more eigenstates results in quantum superposition of two or more values of the quantity. If the quantity is measured, the value of the physical quantity will be random, with a probability equal to the square of the coefficient of the superposition in the linear combination. Immediately after the measurement, the state will be given by the eigenvector corresponding to the measured eigenvalue.

Physical interpretation

It is natural to ask why ordinary everyday objects and events do not seem to display quantum mechanical features such as superposition. Indeed, this is sometimes regarded as "mysterious", for instance by Richard Feynman. In 1935, Erwin Schrödinger devised a well-known thought experiment, now known as Schrödinger's cat, which highlighted this dissonance between quantum mechanics and classical physics.  One modern view is that this mystery is explained by quantum decoherence.  A macroscopic system (such as a cat) may evolve over time into a superposition of classically distinct quantum states (such as "alive" and "dead"). The mechanism that achieves this is a subject of significant research, one mechanism suggests that the state of the cat is entangled with the state of its environment (for instance, the molecules in the atmosphere surrounding it), when averaged over the possible quantum states of the environment (a physically reasonable procedure unless the quantum state of the environment can be controlled or measured precisely) the resulting mixed quantum state for the cat is very close to a classical probabilistic state where the cat has some definite probability to be dead or alive, just as a classical observer would expect in this situation. Another proposed class of theories is that the fundamental time evolution equation is incomplete, and requires the addition of some type of fundamental Lindbladian, the reason for this addition and the form of the additional term varies from theory to theory. A popular theory is Continuous spontaneous localization, where the lindblad term is proportional to the spatial separation of the states, this too results in a quasi-classical probabilistic state.

See also

 Eigenstates
 Mach–Zehnder interferometer
 Penrose interpretation
 Pure qubit state
 Quantum computation
 Schrödinger's cat
 Superposition principle
 Wave packet

References

Bibliography of cited references
 Bohr, N. (1927/1928). The quantum postulate and the recent development of atomic theory, Nature Supplement 14 April 1928, 121: 580–590.
 Cohen-Tannoudji, C., Diu, B., Laloë, F. (1973/1977). Quantum Mechanics, translated from the French by S. R. Hemley, N. Ostrowsky, D. Ostrowsky, second edition, volume 1, Wiley, New York, .
 Dirac, P. A. M. (1930/1958). The Principles of Quantum Mechanics, 4th edition, Oxford University Press.
 Einstein, A. (1949). Remarks concerning the essays brought together in this co-operative volume, translated from the original German by the editor, pp. 665–688 in Schilpp, P. A. editor (1949), Albert Einstein: Philosopher-Scientist, volume , Open Court, La Salle IL.
 Feynman, R. P., Leighton, R.B., Sands, M. (1965). The Feynman Lectures on Physics, volume 3, Addison-Wesley, Reading, MA.
 Merzbacher, E. (1961/1970). Quantum Mechanics, second edition, Wiley, New York.
 Messiah, A. (1961). Quantum Mechanics, volume 1, translated by G.M. Temmer from the French Mécanique Quantique, North-Holland, Amsterdam.
 

Quantum mechanics
Articles containing video clips